The second inauguration of Theodore Roosevelt as president of the United States, took place on Saturday, March 4, 1905, at the East Portico of the United States Capitol in Washington, D.C. This was the 30th inauguration and marked the beginning of the second and only full term of Theodore Roosevelt as president and the only term of Charles W. Fairbanks as vice president. Chief Justice Melville Fuller administered the presidential oath of office.

Inaugural address 

Roosevelt had an optimistic tone to his second inaugural address. He speaks of past successes, but warns that any success in the future will only come with hard work. He commented on how any weak nation shall have nothing to fear from the US, but warns that America will not be the subject for insolent aggression. The President cited good relations with the world as being important, but relations among Americans as most important. He admitted that the Founding Fathers could not have foreseen certain problems that plagued the nation, but assures that these are problems that all great nations face. Roosevelt recognized that the industrial age made it difficult for Americans to adapt to the complexities of modern life, but assured Americans that the technological innovations brought tremendous change in everyday life. He spoke about the difficulty of self-government, and warns that should America fail, it would shake all free nations to their foundations. Roosevelt called this a heavy responsibility, to Americans, to the world, and to the unborn generations. He gave no reason to fear the future or unseen problems, but encourages the problems be met head-on. In his closing, Theodore Roosevelt clarified that the problems facing Americans differs from those of the Founding Fathers, but insisted that these problems be met with the same spirit.

Inaugural parade 
"The inaugural celebration was the largest and most diverse of any in memory—cowboys, Indians (including the Apache Chief Geronimo), coal miners, soldiers, and students were some of the groups represented." Some footage of the parade exists.

Media

See also
Presidency of Theodore Roosevelt
First inauguration of Theodore Roosevelt
1904 United States presidential election

References

External links

 President Theodore Roosevelt's Second Inauguration (1905)
 
 Text of Roosevelt's Inaugural Address

United States presidential inaugurations
1905 in Washington, D.C.
1905 in American politics
Inauguration 2
March 1905 events